Su Kahriz (also Romanized as Sū Kahrīz; also known as Sokārīz, Sū Kahrez, Sukakhrez, and Sū Kārīz) is a village in Khorramdarreh Rural District of the Central District of Khorramdarreh County, Zanjan province, Iran. At the 2006 National Census, its population was 2,206 in 536 households. The following census in 2011 counted 2,396 people in 710 households. The latest census in 2016 showed a population of 2,560 people in 786 households; it was the largest village in its rural district.

References 

Khorramdarreh County

Populated places in Zanjan Province

Populated places in Khorramdarreh County